Starke is a city in and the county seat of Bradford County, Florida, United States. The population was 5,796 at the 2020 census. The origin of the city's name is disputed. Starke may have been named in honor of local landowner George W. Cole's fiancée's family or in honor of Madison Starke Perry, fourth governor of Florida.

History
Founding and 19th century

Prior to 1857, the area that is today Starke was sparsely settled. The announcement of the Fernandina to Cedar Key railroad, which would connect the Atlantic Ocean with the Gulf of Mexico, brought the first known settlement to the community.

In November 1857, the first post office in the area was established by George W. Cole. In 1859, Cole obtained 40 acres of land around the post office, which were described in his documents as the "Original Town of Starke."

In 1858, the railroad reached Starke, bringing new residents to the community. The early 1870s brought on incorporation to the city, and in 1875, Bradford County residents narrowly voted to move the county seat from Lake Butler to Starke. Three additional votes would be taken in later years on the location of the county seat, before the Florida Legislature resolved the issue in 1921 with the creation of Union County.

 Starke's weekly newspaper, The Bradford County Telegraph, began publication in 1879 as The Florida Weekly Telegraph (it continues to be the oldest weekly newspaper in Florida today). The city experienced tremendous growth in the 1880s and 1890s from Florida's citrus industry. Northerners moved to the area in droves to take a stake in the industry, but the state's Great Freeze that came in the winter of 1894-1895 devastated the area's orange groves, moving the citrus industry further south.

20th and 21st centuries

Starke oversaw a period of rapid expansion brought on by the new U.S. Highway 301 in the early 1900s and the construction of Camp Blanding during World War II.

For travelers coming from the northeastern United States, Highway 301 was the quickest route between Jacksonville and Tampa (a title it still holds to this day). Starke's status as one of the largest cities on the route, as well its location on State Road 100, brought numerous hotels to the area. The construction of nearby Camp Blanding as a military training facility during World War II added to the local building boom, and by 1950, the city's population had doubled.

Post-World War II, the boom continued and the area continued to see an influx of residents working in the service industry and in its strawberry fields. Bradford County's famous Strawberry Festival was born during this time, and it continues to attract thousands of visitors today.

In the late 1980s, the city received national media attention during the proceedings of the Ted Bundy case and his eventual execution at Florida State Prison in nearby Raiford, Florida. It also received attention when Lawton Chiles was Florida governor as a notorious speed trap town, even having warning billboards placed on Interstate 10's exit onto south US 301. Other speed traps on this stretch of US 301 between I-10 and I-75 were Waldo, Lawtey, and Hampton. 

During this time, controversy would also arise over the cross located on the city's water tower, as national atheist groups condemned the community. In the early 2000s, a court motion was filed by American Atheists against the city to remove the cross, bringing Starke back into the national spotlight. The battle in court would prove contentious, with most city residents staunchly opposed to its removal. In 2007, a district judge ruled against the city, and the cross would later be moved to a location on private property.

In later years, American Atheists attempted to have a Ten Commandments monument removed from the courtyard of the Bradford County Courthouse. A compromise was eventually reached however in this case.

Geography

Starke is located in east-central Bradford County. U.S. Route 301 passes through the center of the city, leading north  to Baldwin and Interstate 10 (with Jacksonville through it) and southwest (via State Road 24)  to Gainesville.

Climate

Demographics

As of the census of 2000, there were 5,593 people, 2,003 households, and 1,350 families residing in the city. The racial makeup of the city was 67.05% White, 29.54% African American, 0.21% Native American, 1.25% Asian, 0.16% Pacific Islander, 0.64% from other races, and 1.14% from two or more races. Hispanic or Latino of any race were 2.23% of the population.

There were 2,003 households, out of which 32.7% had children under the age of 18 living with them, 43.3% were married couples living together, 20.0% had a female householder with no husband present, and 32.6% were non-families. 28.0% of all households were made up of individuals, and 13.6% had someone living alone who was 65 years of age or older.  The average household size was 2.57 and the average family size was 3.14.

In the city, the population was spread out, with 26.7% under the age of 18, 9.7% from 18 to 24, 25.1% from 25 to 44, 20.3% from 45 to 64, and 18.1% who were 65 years of age or older.  The median age was 36 years. For every 100 females, there were 86.2 males.  For every 100 females age 18 and over, there were 81.1 males.

The median income for a household in the city was $27,021, and the median income for a family was $35,093. Males had a median income of $27,176 versus $17,986 for females. The per capita income for the city was $13,507.  About 19.2% of families and 23.9% of the population were below the poverty line, including 34.9% of those under age 18 and 23.2% of those age 65 or over.

City Government 
Starke has a Commission-Manager form of government, with a mayor, vice mayor and three council members, all elected to single member districts. In addition, the City Clerk and Chief of Police are elected positions. Starke City Officials serve four-year terms.

The current city commissioners are:

 District 1: Danny Nugent
 District 2: Janice Mortimer
 District 3: Shannon Smith (Vice Mayor)
 District 4: Scott Roberts (Mayor)
 District 5: Andy Redding
The City Clerk is James "Jimmy" Crosby and the Chief of Police is Jeff Johnson.

Education
 Bradford High School
 Bradford Middle School
 Starke Elementary School
 Southside Elementary School
Schools within Starke are operated by the Bradford County School District. In addition, the Bradford County Public Library is in Starke. It is a part of the New River Public Library Cooperative.

Higher Education

 Santa Fe College's Andrews Center serves Bradford and Union counties as an important learning and cultural institution.
 North Florida Technical College (Bradford-Union Technical Center), a tertiary institution managed by the school district, is in Starke.

Points of interest

 Call Street Historic District - Starke's downtown is home to locally-owned restaurants, antique shops, a jewelry store, and a movie theatre.
 Bradford County Strawberry Festival - In 1998, city and county residents came together to start the Strawberry Festival to recognize the importance of the strawberry crop in the community. The two day festival, which is held the first week of April, attracts thousands of visitors annually.
 Eugene L. Matthews Historical Museum - This museum, named after the longtime editor of The Bradford County Telegraph, showcases many items from Bradford County's history. It is open select days of the month, or by appointment.
 Andrews Center - Formerly the old Bradford County Courthouse, the Romanesque-style structure built in 1902 is on the National Register of Historic Places. It is widely considered to be the centerpiece of Starke and its distinctive look makes it one of the most recognizable symbols of the city and Bradford County.
 Florida Twin Theatre - Having opened in 1941, the Florida Twin Theatre is one of the oldest movie theatres in north Florida. The theatre has been a popular destination for travelers from around the region for decades.

Film and television locations
Starke has been the location of several Hollywood films, including:
G.I. Jane, which starred Demi Moore and was filmed east of Starke on the Camp Blanding Joint Training Center. 
Joel Schumacher's film Tigerland, starring Colin Farrell was filmed at Camp Blanding. 
Basic starring Samuel L. Jackson and John Travolta was filmed at Camp Blanding.
Why Do Fools Fall in Love starring Halle Berry and Vivica A. Fox.
Starke has been the location of the following television series:
 The Fox Broadcasting Company's reality TV show Boot Camp. 
 The BBC's mini-series The State Within.

Notable people

 Judy Canova, film actress and entertainer
 Doyle Edward Conner Sr, Former Florida Commissioner of Agriculture, Former Speaker of the Florida House of Representatives
 Charley Eugene Johns, 32nd Governor of Florida , Former Florida State Senate President

References

External links
City of Starke official website

Cities in Bradford County, Florida
County seats in Florida
Cities in Florida